Michael Ohoven (born 30 August 1974) is a German film producer and the founder and CEO of Infinity Media. He is the son of German Investment Banker Mario Ohoven and UNESCO Ambassador Ute-Henriette Ohoven. He is married to Puerto Rican model, actress, and former Real Housewife of Beverly Hills Joyce Giraud.

Life and career
Ohoven learned financing and institutional investment at Commerzbank and at his family's investment bank. While studying economics and business administration at University of Cologne, Ohoven joined the International Corporate Affairs division of RTL Television, one of Europe's largest private broadcaster.

After two and a half years, Ohoven left the company to form Infinity Media in 2000. Under his leadership, the company quickly established strong working relationships with major studios, talent representatives, and financial institutions. Amongst numerous international nominations and awards, his films have already been honored with five Academy Award nominations and one win. Ohoven is one of the youngest ever Oscar-nominated producers, and in 2006, The Hollywood Reporter named him one of Hollywood's "Most Prolific Producers".

Filmography

References

German film producers
1974 births
Living people
Film people from Düsseldorf